Don Antonio Francisco Coronel (October 21, 1817 – April 17, 1894) was a Californio politician and ranchero who was Mayor of Los Angeles and California State Treasurer. Coronel was considered one of the first preservationists in Los Angeles, and his private collection formed the basis of the Natural History Museum of Los Angeles County.

Career

Antonio Francisco Coronel was the son of Ygnacio Coronel, born in Mexico City in the last years of colonial New Spain. Coronel was 17 years of age when he came to Alta California with his parents in 1834, as a part of the Híjar-Padrés Colony.

In 1838, he was appointed Assistant Secretary of Tribunals for the Pueblo de Los Ángeles. In 1843, he became Justice of the Peace (Juez de Paz, the equivalent of Mayor at that time). During the Mexican–American War in 1846–47, Antonio was a captain and sergeant-at-arms in the Mexican artillery and took part in military operations against the United States.

Once the war had ended, Antonio Coronel was the first Los Angeles County Assessor from 1850 to 1856. In 1853, Coronel became Mayor of Los Angeles. Coronel was a ward councilman on the Los Angeles Common Council (1854–1867)

He was the California State Treasurer from 1867 to 1871. In 1873, Coronel married Mariana Williamson.

His donated collection made the basis for the Natural History Museum of Los Angeles County. Antonio Coronel became the owner of Rancho Los Feliz.

Personal life
He was married to Mariana W. de Coronel.

His brother, Manuel F. Coronel, was the first Zanjero of Los Angeles. He had a sister, Maria Antonio Coronel, who married Alexis Godey in 1863.

Further reading
Coronel,  Antonio; edited by Doyce B. Nunis, Jr. (1994). "Tales of Mexican California."  Bellerophon Books, 122 Helena St., Santa Barbara, CA  93101.

References 

Californios
Mayors of Los Angeles
1817 births
1894 deaths
American politicians of Mexican descent
Los Angeles Common Council (1850–1889) members
19th-century American politicians
Mexican military personnel of the Mexican–American War
Politicians from Los Angeles
State treasurers of California
Hispanic and Latino American mayors in California
California
Mexican
Mexican-American culture in California